Suffolk County Cricket Club was originally established on 27 July 1864, and competed in the Minor Counties Championship from 1904 to 1914, though without success. The present club was founded in August 1932, and has since played minor counties cricket from that year, as well as playing in List A cricket from 1966 to 2005, using a different number of home grounds during that time. Their first home minor counties fixture in 1904 was against Norfolk at the Town Ground, Felixstowe, while their first home List A match came 62 years later against Kent in the 1966 Gillette Cup at Ipswich School Ground.

The fourteen grounds that Suffolk have used for home matches since 1904 are listed below, with statistics complete through to the end of the 2014 season.

Grounds

List A
Below is a complete list of grounds used by Suffolk County Cricket Club when it was permitted to play List A matches. These grounds have also held Minor Counties Championship and MCCA Knockout Trophy matches.

Minor Counties
Below is a complete list of grounds used by Suffolk County Cricket Club in Minor Counties Championship and MCCA Knockout Trophy matches.

Notes

References

Suffolk County Cricket Club
Cricket grounds in Suffolk
Suffolk